Astro Cam Xúc was a Vietnamese satellite channel run as a joint venture with Ho Chi Minh City Television (HTVC). The channel was launched in 2008 and first appeared on VCTV for six months. In 2013, media production company BHD stopped distributing Astro Cảm Xúc.

References

Television networks in Vietnam
2008 establishments in Vietnam
Television channels and stations established in 2008
2013 disestablishments in Vietnam
Television channels and stations disestablished in 2013